Bindi Singh Kullar (born January 11, 1976 in Richmond, British Columbia) is a Canadian field hockey player, who played his first international senior tournament for the Men's National Team in 1996. His father, Pritpal Singh Kullar who hailed from Sansarpur village in Punjab, was also a field hockey player and went on to represent Canada in 1978.

International senior competitions
 1996 — World Cup Preliminary, Sardinia (2nd)
 1997 — World Cup Qualifier, Kuala Lumpur (5th)
 1998 — World Cup, Utrecht (8th)
 1998 — Commonwealth Games, Kuala Lumpur (not ranked)
 1999 — Pan American Games, Winnipeg (1st)
 2000 — Americas Cup, Cuba (2nd)
 2000 — Olympic Games, Sydney (10th)
 2001 — World Cup Qualifier, Edinburgh (8th)
 2002 — Commonwealth Games, Manchester (6th)
 2004 — Olympic Qualifying Tournament, Madrid (11th)
 2007 — Pan American Games, Rio de Janeiro (1st)
 2008 — Olympic Games, Beijing (10th)

References

 Profile

External links

1976 births
Sportspeople from British Columbia
Canadian male field hockey players
Field hockey players at the 1998 Commonwealth Games
Field hockey players at the 2000 Summer Olympics
Field hockey players at the 2002 Commonwealth Games
Field hockey players at the 2008 Summer Olympics
Living people
Olympic field hockey players of Canada
People from Richmond, British Columbia
Canadian people of Punjabi descent
Canadian sportspeople of Indian descent
Pan American Games gold medalists for Canada
Pan American Games medalists in field hockey
1998 Men's Hockey World Cup players
Field hockey players at the 1999 Pan American Games
Medalists at the 1999 Pan American Games
Commonwealth Games competitors for Canada